The Clausius theorem (1855), also known as the Clausius inequality, states that for a thermodynamic system (e.g. heat engine or heat pump) exchanging heat with external thermal reservoirs and undergoing a thermodynamic cycle, the following inequality holds.

The closed integral is carried out along a thermodynamic process path from the initial/final state to the same initial/final state (thermodynamic cycle). In principle, the closed integral can start and end at an arbitrary point along the path.

For multiple thermal reservoirs with different temperatures  interacting a thermodynamic system undergoing a thermodynamic cycle, the Clausius inequality can be written as the following for expression clarity:

where  is an infinitesimal heat from the reservoir  to the system. 

In the special case of a reversible process, the equality holds, and the reversible case is used to introduce the state function known as entropy.

The generalized "inequality of Clausius"

The Clausius inequality is a consequence of applying the second law of thermodynamics at each infinitesimal stage of heat transfer. The Clausius statement states that it is impossible to construct a device whose sole effect is the transfer of heat from a cool reservoir to a hot reservoir. Equivalently, heat spontaneously flows from a hot body to a cooler one, not the other way around.

History

The Clausius theorem is a mathematical representation of the second law of thermodynamics. It was developed by Rudolf Clausius who intended to explain the relationship between the heat flow in a system and the entropy of the system and its surroundings. Clausius developed this in his efforts to explain entropy and define it quantitatively. In more direct terms, the theorem gives us a way to determine if a cyclical process is reversible or irreversible. The Clausius theorem provides a quantitative formula for understanding the second law.

Clausius was one of the first to work on the idea of entropy and is even responsible for giving it that name. What is now known as the Clausius theorem was first published in 1862 in Clausius' sixth memoir, "On the Application of the Theorem of the Equivalence of Transformations to Interior Work". Clausius sought to show a proportional relationship between entropy and the energy flow by heating (δQ) into a system. In a system, this heat energy can be transformed into work, and work can be transformed into heat through a cyclical process. Clausius writes that "The algebraic sum of all the transformations occurring in a cyclical process can only be less than zero, or, as an extreme case, equal to nothing." In other words, the equation

with 𝛿Q being energy flow into the system due to heating and T being absolute temperature of the body when that energy is absorbed, is found to be true for any process that is cyclical and reversible. Clausius then took this a step further and determined that the following relation must be found true for any cyclical process that is possible, reversible or not. This relation is the "Clausius inequality",

Now that this is known, there must be a relation developed between the Clausius inequality and entropy. The amount of entropy S added to the system during the cycle is defined as

It has been determined, as stated in the second law of thermodynamics, that the entropy is a state function: It depends only upon the state that the system is in, and not what path the system took to get there. This is in contrast to the amount of energy added as heat (𝛿Q) and as work (𝛿W), which may vary depending on the path. In a cyclic process, therefore, the entropy of the system at the beginning of the cycle must equal to the entropy at the end of the cycle (because the entropy is a state function), regardless of whether the process is reversible or irreversible.

If the amount of energy added by heating can be measured during the process, and the temperature can be measured during the process, then the Clausius inequality can be used to determine whether the process is reversible or irreversible by carrying out the integration in the Clausius inequality. If integral result is equal to zero then it is a reversible process, while if greater than zero then an irreversible process (less than zero cannot be possible).

Proof

The temperature that enters in the denominator of the integrand in the Clausius inequality is the temperature of the external thermal reservoir with which the system exchanges heat. At each instant of the process, the system is in contact with an external reservoir.
 

In the proof of the Clausius theorem or inequality, a sign convention of heat is used; in the perspective of an object under consideration, when heat is absorbed by the object then the heat is positive, while when heat leaves from the object then the heat is negative. 

This means the magnitude of the entropy "loss" from the hot reservoir,  is equal to or less than the magnitude of the entropy "gain" by the system, so the net entropy change  is zero or positive.

The magnitude of the entropy gained by the cold reservoir  is equal to or greater than the magnitude of the entropy loss of the system , so the net entropy change  is also zero or positive in this case.

In particular,

which was to be proven (and is now proven).

In summary, (the inequality in the third statement below, being obviously guaranteed by the second law of thermodynamics, which is the basis of our calculation),

 (as a cyclic process),

For a reversible cyclic process, there is no generation of entropy in each of the infinitesimal heat transfer processes since there is practically no temperature difference between the system and the thermal reservoirs (I.e., the system entropy change and the reservoirs entropy change is equal in magnitude and opposite in sign at any instant.), so the following equality holds,

 (as a cyclic process),

The Clausius inequality is a consequence of applying the second law of thermodynamics at each infinitesimal stage of heat transfer, and is thus in a sense a weaker condition than the Second Law itself.

Heat engine efficiency 

In respecting the abovementioned sign convention of heat,
,
where  is heat transferred from the engine to the cold reservoir.

By substituting this inequality to the above equation results in,
.
This is the limit of heat engine efficiencies, and the equality of this expression is what is called the Carnot efficiency, that is the efficiency of all reversible heat engines and the maximum efficiency of all heat engines.

See also
 Kelvin-Planck statement
 Carnot's theorem (thermodynamics)
 Carnot heat engine
 Introduction to entropy

References

Further reading
Morton, A. S., and P.J. Beckett. Basic Thermodynamics. New York: Philosophical Library Inc., 1969. Print.
Saad, Michel A. Thermodynamics for Engineers. Englewood Cliffs: Prentice-Hall, 1966. Print.
Hsieh, Jui Sheng. Principles of Thermodynamics. Washington, D.C.: Scripta Book Company, 1975. Print.
Zemansky, Mark W. Heat and Thermodynamics. 4th ed. New York: McGwaw-Hill Book Company, 1957. Print.
Clausius, Rudolf. The Mechanical Theory of Heat. London: Taylor and Francis, 1867. eBook

External links

Laws of thermodynamics
Physics theorems